Lake Tahoe Preparatory School (formerly known as Squaw Valley Academy) is a college-prep boarding school in Olympic Valley, California,

.

About

Squaw Valley Academy was founded in 1978 by Donald Rees. In 2020, Squaw Valley Academy became Lake Tahoe Preparatory School.

The school is located on 2.8 acres and has five on-campus buildings; students have access to four. Three buildings have ground level classrooms and offices, while the second and third levels are dormitory rooms. The fourth is the administrative building, with offices and the dining hall on the ground level, and offices and classrooms on the second level. The fifth building is the maintenance building.

The school is located about two miles from the Tahoe Palisades ski resort and under five miles from Alpine Meadows.

Academics
The school's primary focus is on college preparation for high school students (although this statement is controversial). 

The school provides Advanced Placement (AP) courses, ESL for international students, an Academic Learning Center for struggling students, college counseling  and SAT prep. It is also a Certified SAT testing location.

Students eat breakfast before attending morning classes Monday through Friday, eat lunch, and depart campus for supervised afternoon activities. They return to campus for dinner, and after a brief rest, they gather for mandatory, two-hour study hall, Sunday through Thursday nights. Students use study hall to finish their coursework from the day, prepare for the coming class the following day, write and research reports, and gain further instruction on course topics from teachers.

Athletics
The school mascot is the brown bear. Students may participate in intramural soccer. Students who wish to compete on a recreational level may participate in programs affiliated with Palisades Tahoe

Due to the location of the school, students who meet or exceed set academic standards may ski or snowboard daily at Tahoe Palisades ski resort. The school encourages students to "ride" (ski or snowboard) at the resort of their choice, and makes arrangements to transport and supervise students.

References

Private high schools in California
Private preparatory schools in California
Educational institutions established in 1978
Educational institutions disestablished in 2020
1978 establishments in California
2020 disestablishments in California
Olympic Valley, California